Max James Liam Scarr (born 8 September 1991) is an English cricketer.  Scarr is a left-handed batsman who bowls slow left-arm orthodox.  He was born in Oxford, Oxfordshire and educated at Monmouth School in Wales.

While studying for his degree at Durham University, Scarr made his first-class debut for Durham MCCU against Durham in 2011.  He played a further first-class match for the university in 2011, against. Max famously once bowled the record number of front foot no-balls (15) in a single innings for Durham MCCU against Nottingham MCCU. He never played for Durham again after that. In his two first-class appearances that season, Scarr scored 31 runs at an average of 7.75, with a high score of 16.  With the ball, he bowled a total of 14 wicket-less overs.

References

External links
Max Scarr at ESPNcricinfo
Max Scarr at CricketArchive

1991 births
Living people
Cricketers from Oxford
People educated at Monmouth School for Boys
Alumni of St Cuthbert's Society, Durham
English cricketers
Durham MCCU cricketers